Highway 48 is a highway in the Canadian province of Saskatchewan.

This highway was known as Saskatchewan Highway 16 until 1976. It was renumbered as Highway 48 when the Yellowhead Highway was designated as Highway 16 throughout the province.

The original Highway 48 was located in southwestern Saskatchewan, travelling from the Willow Creek Border Crossing to Highway 13 at Govenlock. The route was renumbered to Highway 348 in the 1960s before becoming part of Highway 21 in the 1970s.

Major intersections
For west to east:

References

048